Ralph King may refer to:

 Ralph King-Milbanke, 2nd Earl of Lovelace (1839–1906), British author
 Ralph E. King (1902–1974), member of the Louisiana State Senate
 Ralph King (American football) (1901–1978), American football player